The Dogs Act 1906 is an Act of the Parliament of the United Kingdom which deals with dogs.

The main provisions relating to civil liability have now been repealed by the Animals Act 1971.

See also
Dogs Act

United Kingdom Acts of Parliament 1906
Animal welfare and rights legislation in the United Kingdom
Dog law in the United Kingdom